Samuel Avery (died 1664) was an English politician who sat in the House of Commons  in 1654.

Avery was a merchant of the City of London and a member of the Worshipful Company of Merchant Taylors. In 1645 he was elected alderman of the City of London for Cripplegate ward. He was Master of the Merchant Taylors Company for 1645 to 1646 and was Commissioner for Customs from 1645 to 1649. On 16 September 1647 he became alderman instead for Bassishaw ward and remained until 1653. He was Sheriff of London for the year 1647 to 1648.

In 1654, Avery was elected Member of Parliament for City of London in the First Protectorate Parliament.

Samuel Hartlib's papers contain a letter, allegedly to Samuel Avery from his brother Joseph, dated 16 June 1642. In it, Joseph indicates he is living in Germany, conducting secret negotiations for King Charles I. In response to a request from Samuel, he provides intelligence on the preparedness and intentions of Denmark's navy.

References

Year of birth missing
1664 deaths
Members of the Parliament of England for the City of London
17th-century English businesspeople